Philipp Xaver Walulis (born August 5, 1980) is a German television presenter and radio host.

Walulis was born in Starnberg and raised in Pöcking. He studied at the Ludwig Maximilian University of Munich. From 2004 he appeared as a host many radio shows, where he joined with satirical shows. He founded the satirical band Aggro Grünwald (de) in 2007. Many large media organisations such as 3sat or the Süddeutsche Zeitung fell for this parody.
At the end of 2011, on Tele 5, he started the satirical television show Walulis sieht fern for which he was awarded the Grimme-Preis. The show ran from May 2012 to September 2016 on EinsPlus on the ARD network. The television show parodies German television under the motto "Fernsehen macht blöd, aber auch unglaublich viel Spaß!" ("TV makes you stupid, but it is also a lot of fun!").

References

External links 

 Official website 

1980 births
Living people
People from Starnberg
German television presenters
German radio presenters